Je t'aime is the fourth single taken from Armand Van Helden's seventh studio album, called Ghettoblaster. It features Nicole Roux on vocals. It samples heavily from the song 'Can You Dance' by Kenny 'Jammin' Jason and DJ Fast Eddie Smith, from 1987.

Track listing
Australian CD Single
"Je T'Aime" (Radio Edit) - 3:37
"Je T'Aime" (Original Mix) - 7:21
"Je T'Aime" (Digital Dog Remix) - 7:27
"Je T'Aime" (Switch Remix) - 5:24
"Je T'Aime" (SMD Remix) - 7:25
"Je T'Aime" (Cagedbaby Remix) - 6:08

Charts

Release history

References

2008 singles
Armand Van Helden songs
2007 songs
Songs written by Armand Van Helden